Bauer Brothers refers to the Austrian botanical illustrators who were brothers:

 Franz Bauer (1758–1840)
 Ferdinand Bauer (1760–1826)
 Josef Anton Bauer (1756–1830)

See also 
 Bauer (surname)